Sergey Sergeyevich Ivanov (born 5 June 1984) is a Russian football referee. He lives in Rostov-on-Don.

He has been a FIFA referee since 2014.

References

External links
 
 

1984 births
Living people
Russian football referees